The 2016 United States House of Representatives elections in Colorado were held on November 8, 2016, to elect the seven U.S. representatives from the state of Colorado, one from each of the state's seven congressional districts. The elections coincided with the 2016 U.S. presidential election, as well as other elections to the House of Representatives, elections to the United States Senate and various state and local elections. The primaries were held on June 28.

District 1

The 1st district is located in Central Colorado and includes most of the city of Denver. The incumbent is Democrat Diana DeGette, who has represented the district since 1997. She was re-elected with 66% of the vote in 2014 and the district has a PVI of D+18.

Democratic primary

Candidates
Declared
 Diana DeGette - Incumbent
 Charles H. "Chuck" Norris

Results

Republican primary

Candidates
Declared
 Charles "Casper" Stockham

Results

General election

Results

District 2

The 2nd district is located in Northern Colorado and encompasses seven counties. The incumbent is Democrat Jared Polis, who has represented the district since 2009. He was re-elected with 56% of the vote in 2014 and isn't expected to have a primary challenger.

Democratic primary

Candidates
Declared
 Jared Polis - Incumbent

Results

Republican primary

Candidates
Declared
 Nicholas Morse, marketing executive

Results

Libertarian primary

Candidates
 Richard Longstreth

General election

Results

District 3

The 3rd district is located in Western and Southern Colorado and includes a large number of sparsely populated counties and the city of Grand Junction. The incumbent is Republican Scott Tipton, who has represented the district since 2011. He was re-elected with 58% of the vote in 2014 and the district has a PVI of R+5.

Tipton was mentioned as a potential candidate for the U.S. Senate, but announced that he will run for re-election instead.

Democratic primary

Candidates
Declared
 Gail Schwartz

Results

Republican primary

Candidates
Declared
 Scott Tipton - Incumbent
 Alexander Beinstein

Results

General election

Results

District 4

The 4th district is located in Eastern Colorado and includes numerous sparsely populated counties.  The incumbent is Republican Ken Buck, who has represented the district since 2015. He was elected with 65% of the vote in 2014 and the district has a PVI of R+11.

Democratic primary

Candidates
Declared
 Bob Seay

Results

Republican primary

Candidates
Declared
 Ken Buck - Incumbent

Results

General election

Results

District 5

The 5th district is located in Central Colorado and includes Fremont, El Paso, Teller and Chaffee counties and the city of Colorado Springs. The incumbent is Republican Doug Lamborn, who has represented the district since 2007. He was re-elected with 60% of the vote in 2014 and the district has a PVI of R+13.

Democratic primary

Candidates
Declared
 Misty Plowright - Army veteran 
 Donald Martinez

Results

Republican primary

Candidates
Declared
 Calandra Vargas
 Doug Lamborn - Incumbent

Results

General election

Results

District 6

The 6th district is located in Central Colorado and surrounds the city of Denver from the east, including the city of Aurora. The incumbent is Republican Mike Coffman, who has represented the district since 2009. He was re-elected with 52% of the vote in 2012 and the district has a PVI of D+1. The conservative political advocacy group Americans for Prosperity, which receives funding from the Koch brothers, launched a six-figure campaign effort supporting Coffman's candidacy.

On July 5, 2015, Morgan Carroll, the former president of the Colorado Senate, announced she planned to challenge Coffman. 
Andrew Romanoff, the former Speaker of the Colorado House of Representatives and the 2014 Democratic nominee, considered running again but ultimately decided against it. Former state representative Edward Casso established an exploratory committee in 2014 in preparation for a potential challenge, but ultimately did not run.

Democratic primary

Candidates
Declared
 Morgan Carroll, former Minority Leader of the Colorado Senate

Declined
 Edward Casso, former state representative
 Rebecca McClellan, Centennial City Councilor
 Karen Middleton, former state representative and former member of the Colorado State Board of Education
 Andrew Romanoff, former Speaker of the Colorado House of Representatives, candidate for U.S. Senate in 2010 and nominee for the seat in 2014
 Rhonda Fields, state representative

Results

Republican primary

Candidates
Declared
 Mike Coffman - Incumbent

Results

General election

Results

District 7

The 7th district is located in Central Colorado, to the north and west of Denver and includes the cities of Thornton and Westminster and most of Lakewood. The incumbent is Democrat Ed Perlmutter, who has represented the district since 2007. He was re-elected with 55% of the vote in 2014 and the district has a PVI of D+5.

Democratic primary

Candidates
Declared
 Ed Perlmutter - Incumbent

Results

Republican primary

Candidates
Declared
 George Athanasopoulos

Results

General election

Results

References

External links
U.S. House elections in Colorado, 2016 at Ballotpedia
Campaign contributions at OpenSecrets

Colorado
2016
United States House of Representatives